Azazel, a demon from Jewish mythology, has been developed into characters in popular culture.

Books 
Robertson Davies introduces Azazel and Samahazai as rebel angels in the first book of his Cornish Trilogy, The Rebel Angels. They are said to have "betrayed the secrets of Heaven to King Solomon", so that "God threw them out of Heaven", and on earth "they taught tongues, and healing and laws and hygiene".
 Azazel is the principal character in a series of short stories written by Isaac Asimov.
 Azazel is a leader of the fallen angels in the light novel (and manga/anime) series High School DxD. He becomes a teacher and club advisor at their school.
 In the light novel (and manga/anime) series Blue Exorcist Azazel is one of the eight Demon Kings and a son of Satan
Azazello is a character in Mikhail Bulgakov's novel The Master and Margarita.
In the fifth book of The Mortal Instruments, Azazel is a greater demon raised by warlock Magnus Bane to help in a search for shadowhunter Jace Lightwood. 
Neil Gaiman's Sandman comics, published by DC Comics, features Azazel as a character.
The X-Men comic books features a mutant based on the legendary demon, created by writer Chuck Austen.
 In José Saramago's book "Cain" Azazel is a God's cherubin who lets Eve into the Garden of Eden after she and Adam had been expelled from it. Enchanted by Eve's naked body, he makes a secret deal with her and gets her fruits from the garden, as she and her husband were wandering hungry and with no means of survival after the expulsion.
 In poem Moses by Ivan Franko, Azazel is a demon of the desert and is the main antagonist.

Movies 
 In the film "Fallen" with Denzel Washington, Azazel was a demonic entity passed from person to person by touch.
In the Turkish horror movie Şeytan-ı Racim, he helps to get rid of jinn-persecution, but impersonate to the people as a human called Mehmet Efendi.
In the film ‘’The House with a Clock in Its Walls’’, Azazel is a demon who offers corrupt powers to the antagonist Isaac Izard (played by Kyle MacLachlan).
In the film Semum, Azazil is mentioned by a demon to be his new lord after he has abandoned God.

Games 
In The Binding of Isaac: Rebirth, Azazel is a playable character. He begins the game with the ability to fire a small red laser called brimstone and has the appearance of a demon, with black skin and wings.
In the 2011 action video game El Shaddai: Ascension of the Metatron, Azazel is one of the strongest Grigori who controls the human evolutions also the angelic and mortal technologies. Azazel is the right-man of the fallen angel Semyaza. In the near-end game, Azazel transforms into a Locust-like monster.
Azazel is a demon in many of the Shin Megami Tensei series of video games, whose lore describes it as a Grigori in Judaism.
In Star Ocean: Till the End of Time, Azazel is the Sphere Corporation's Chief of Security and helps release the Executioneers by orders from Luther Lansfield. His name was changed to Azazer in the English version.
Azazel is the name of the final boss in Namco's Tekken 6. He is a huge, demonic, crystalline, dragon-like creature resembling the Egyptian god Set, and he is fought inside an ancient Egyptian torch-lit temple in Egypt. He is revealed to be the creator of the entity known as "Devil" and by extension the Devil Gene that exists in the Hachijō and Mishima bloodlines including Kazumi (maiden name Hachijō) Mishima, Kazuya Mishima and Jin Kazama. This makes Azazel the Bigger Bad and Greater Scope Villain of the franchise.
Azazel is the name given to the Shadow of Ichiryusai Madarame, the second boss of Persona 5. 
Azazel appears in the Warhammer Fantasy world as a champion of the chaos god Slaanesh.
In Kingdom of Loathing, Azazel, the Archduke of Hey Deze, sends the player on a quest to return his misplaced talismans of evil power. He is described as a "rip in reality that's full of red, glowing eyes and razor-sharp teeth".
In Helltaker, Azazel appears as one of the characters the protagonist can add to his harem, the only member who is an angel rather than a demon. She reappears in the game's bonus chapter, Examtaker, as the main antagonist, having since transformed into a demon due to the harem's sinful influence.
In Origins, the first installment of the Detectives United series of hidden object games from Elephant Games, Azazel is the name of one of the five stones of power needed to construct an artifact called the Reality Cube. Its specific virtue is that it can supply an unlimited source of energy.
Azazel appears in Dragalia Lost as a summonable dragon whose existence was scrubbed from history by the Ilian Church.

Television 
In the CW TV series Supernatural, Azazel is the main antagonist in seasons one and two, whom the main characters begin hunting to seek revenge for the death of their mother. However, the name is not mentioned until season three, prior to this he is always called "the Yellow-Eyed Demon".
In the anime Rage of Bahamut: Genesis, Azazel is an antagonistic fallen angel and the subordinate of Lucifer, both of whom side with the demons against the gods.
In the mini-series Fallen, Azazel appears in the second part. He is released after 5000 years of imprisonment and starts his search for Aaron.
The British TV series Hex featured fallen angel Azazeal (Michael Fassbender) as one of its primary antagonists.
The Mortal Instruments TV adaptation Shadowhunters depicted Azazel in season 2, portrayed by Brett Donahue.
The anime High School DxD features a fallen angel named Azazel.

References

Demons in popular culture